Harold Nathan Harlan (December 4, 1927 – August 19, 1985) was an American football end and coach. He served as the head coach at the University of St. Thomas from 1958 to 1969. He played college football at Cincinnati and also coached several high school teams.

Early life and education
Harlan was born on December 4, 1927, in Austin, Minnesota. He attended St. Augustine High School, where he earned varsity letters in football, baseball, and basketball. Harlan played college football at Cincinnati, starting at end in 1950, 1951, and 1952. He graduated from Cincinnati in June 1953.

Before attending Cincinnati, Harlan had done undergraduate work at the University of Minnesota and Drake University.

Harlan served in World War II.

Professional career

Coaching career
After being released by Green Bay, Harlan was a coach and taught social studies at Milan High School in Minnesota.

In 1954, Harlan was named head football coach at Glencoe High School, which had gone winless in the past two seasons. In his first year with the team, Glencoe compiled a 3–5 record. Harlan led them to the conference championship in 1955 with a 4–3–1 record. He received "high praise" from the school administration for his efforts.

In 1956, Harlan was hired as head football coach at Woodward High School in Cincinnati, Ohio. He succeeded Ed Biles, who had become the freshman coach at Xavier University. Harlan served as head coach for two seasons.

In 1958, Harlan became the head football coach at the University of St. Thomas, succeeding Frank Deig. Harlan ended up coaching twelve seasons for St. Thomas, before being fired in 1969 after posting a 1–9 record.

Death
Harlan died on August 19, 1985, at the age of 57, following a brief illness.

Head coaching record

College football

References

1927 births
1985 deaths
Players of American football from Minnesota
People from Austin, Minnesota
Baseball players from Minnesota
Basketball players from Minnesota
Cincinnati Bearcats football players
Green Bay Packers players
American football ends
High school football coaches in Minnesota
High school football coaches in Ohio
St. Thomas (Minnesota) Tommies football coaches